Vetus Testamentum is a quarterly academic journal covering various aspects of the Old Testament. It is published by Brill Publishers for its sponsor, the International Organisation for the Study of the Old Testament. It is a major Old Testament scholarly journal.

References

Biblical studies journals
Publications established in 1951
Brill Publishers academic journals
Quarterly journals
Multilingual journals
English-language journals
French-language journals
German-language journals